The 1939 Rose Bowl was the 25th edition of the college football bowl game, played at the Rose Bowl in Pasadena, California, on Monday, January 2 and concluded the 1938 college football season.

The seventh-ranked USC Trojans of the Pacific Coast Conference (PCC) downed the undefeated #3 Duke Blue Devils of the Southern Conference, 7–3.

Scoreless after three quarters, Duke gained the lead with a 23-yard field goal by Tony Ruffa early in the fourth. However, backup quarterback Doyle Nave of the Trojans completed four straight passes to sophomore end "Antelope" Al Krueger, who outmaneuvered Eric "The Red" Tipton and scored the winning touchdown with one minute remaining. Krueger's touchdown marked the first points scored against Duke during the season.

For his performance in the game, Krueger was inducted into the Rose Bowl Hall of Fame in the class of 1995.

Scoring

First quarter
No scoring

Second quarter
No scoring

Third quarter
No scoring

Fourth quarter
Duke – Tony Ruffa 23-yard field goal
USC – Al Krueger, 19-yard pass from Doyle Nave (Phil Gaspar kick)

Statistics
{| class=wikitable style="text-align:center"
|-
! Team Stats
! USC
! Duke
|-
| First downs 
| 13
| 5
|-
|-
| Rushing yards 
| 128
| 84
|-
| Passing (att–com–int)
| 30–12–3
| 13–4–2
|-
| Passing yards 
| 81
| 59
|-
| Total offense 
| 209
| 143
|}

Notes
 This was the 50th Tournament of Roses Parade, with ten-year-old Grand Marshal Shirley Temple (the youngest) presiding over the parade and the game

References

Rose Bowl
Rose Bowl Game
Duke Blue Devils football bowl games
USC Trojans football bowl games
Rose Bowl
January 1939 sports events